The thornback skate (Dentiraja lemprieri) is a species of skate of the family Rajidae. A bottom-dwelling fish, it is endemic to Australia, occurring in relatively shallow waters from near-shore to 170 metres. The thornback skate can grow up to 52 cm long.

References

External links 
 Article about the Thornback Skate, Australian Museum

Rajiformes
Marine fish of Southern Australia
Marine fish of Tasmania
thornback skate
Taxonomy articles created by Polbot